Maharaja Surajmal Institute is a private college located in Janakpuri, New Delhi, India. The college is affiliated to Guru Gobind Singh Indraprastha University (GGSIPU) and offers courses BBA(G), BBA(B&I), BCA, BTECH, BCOM, B.Ed., running in morning and evening shifts.

It is one of the top colleges of GGSIPU and is generally ranked in top 10 colleges for its programmes like BBA and B.COM in Times of India and other published media. The college also offers specialised BBA programmes like BBA banking and insurance.

See also 
 Maharaja Surajmal Institute of Technology

References 

Colleges in India